Crown Imperial is an orchestral march by William Walton, commissioned for the coronation of King George VI in Westminster Abbey in 1937. It is in the Pomp and Circumstance tradition, with a brisk opening contrasting with a broad middle section, leading to a resounding conclusion. The work has been heard at subsequent state occasions in the Abbey: the coronation of Queen Elizabeth II in 1953 and the wedding of Prince William in 2011. It has been recorded in its original orchestral form and in arrangements for organ, military band and brass band.

Background and first performances

In the 1920s William Walton had been regarded by many as an avant-garde composer, but by the mid-1930s he was seen as in the broad English musical tradition. On the accession of Edward VIII in 1936 the BBC wanted to commission a coronation march in the genre of Elgar's Pomp and Circumstance set. Elgar had died in 1934, and his successor as Britain's best-known composer, Ralph Vaughan Williams, was not given to writing such music. Kenneth Wright of the BBC's music department wrote to his colleague Julian Herbage in November 1936:

By the time the BBC formally commissioned Walton, in March 1937, King Edward had abdicated and the forthcoming coronation was that of his brother and successor, George VI.

Walton, usually a slow and painstaking worker, wrote Crown Imperial in less than a fortnight. The title may have been drawn from William Dunbar's poem "In Honour of the City of London", which Walton set as a cantata of the same name in 1937; it included the line ‘In beawtie beryng the crone imperial". Walton put those words as a superscription at the head of the march, but he said the inspiration for his title was a speech in Shakespeare's Henry V:

     I am a king that find thee, and I know
     'Tis not the balm, the sceptre and the ball,
     The sword, the mace, the crown imperial,
     The intertissued robe of gold and pearl,
     The farced title running 'fore the king,
     The throne he sits on, nor the tide of pomp
     That beats upon the high shore of this world,
     No, not all these, thrice-gorgeous ceremony,
     Not all these, laid in bed majestical,
     Can sleep so soundly as the wretched slave.
He later drew on the same speech for the title of his 1953 coronation march, amending Sceptre and Ball to Orb and Sceptre.

Before its first public hearing the march was performed on 16 April 1937 in HMV's recording studio. Sir Adrian Boult conducted the BBC Symphony Orchestra. Boult and the BBC orchestra broadcast a live performance from the concert hall of Broadcasting House on 9 May.

The march was performed at the coronation on 12 May 1937, by the "Coronation Orchestra", an ad hoc ensemble of Britain's top orchestral players, conducted by Boult. Crown Imperial was part of the musical programme preceding the service, and was played during the procession of Queen Mary, the dowager queen, into the Abbey.

Structure

Crown Imperial is scored for an orchestra of three flutes (third doubling piccolo), two oboes, cor anglais, two clarinets, bass clarinet, two bassoons, contrabassoon – four horns, three trumpets, three trombones, tuba – timpani, two percussion (bass drum, side drum, tenor drum, cymbals, triangle, glockenspiel, tubular bell, large gong) – harp – organ (optional) – strings. Walton revised the work in 1963 and made substantial cuts.

The work is in an ABABC form. It opens in C major with a brisk, rhythmically pointed theme, marked allegro reale (regal). The following trio section, in A-flat major, is a broad  cantabile Elgarian theme introduced by clarinets, cor anglais and violas with the other strings providing the accompaniment. Then both march and trio reappear in C again and come to a climax in what the critic Neil Tierney describes as "a conclusion of breathtaking magnificence".

Critical reception

Some critics viewed Crown Imperial as evidence that Walton had abandoned modernism. A reviewer in The Musical Times called it "frankly a pastiche on a well-known model of ternary pomp and circumstance, with the regulation strut and swagger, plenty of plain diatonics, and a nobilmente tune in the middle". The reviewer judged it "unrepresentative of the composer, except as an example of competence" and "unlikely to survive". To some it was "Pomp and Circumstance March No 6".
 In Grove's Dictionary of Music and Musicians Byron Adams describes the march in Walton's 1931 cantata Belshazzar's Feast as a parody of Elgar, but he finds Crown Imperial "a less equivocal homage to Elgar ... the finest and most infectious of Walton’s essays in that genre" In a 1984 study of Walton and his music, Neil Tierney calls the work a masterpiece that perfectly conjures up the grandeur and dignity of the Coronation ceremonial – "music which, opulent and grandiloquent like Elgar’s Pomp and Circumstance nationalism, proved worthy of a glorious occasion".

Arrangements
Crown Imperial has been arranged for organ by Herbert Murrill;  Christopher Palmer prepared a version for solo organ, brass, timpani and percussion (with harp ad lib), specifically for the Laurence Olivier Memorial Service in October 1989. An arrangement by W. J. Duthoit for military band was published in 1937. Other arrangements include one for solo piano by Walton (1937),  and one for piano duet (1949) by Murrill. There is also a vocal adaptation by Arthur Sandford with words by Doris Arnold "That we may never fail" (1948), commissioned by the BBC for a gala variety concert in honour of the silver wedding of George VI and his wife.

Later history
The march was played, as was a new work by Walton – Orb and Sceptre – at the coronation of Queen Elizabeth II in 1953. Crown Imperial was performed more recently as a recessional piece at the wedding of Prince William and Catherine Middleton on 29 April 2011.

The composer's autograph manuscript score is located at the Beinecke Rare Book and Manuscript Library at Yale University. The march is traditionally played each year as part of the university's commencement exercises.

Recordings
BBC Symphony Orchestra, Sir Adrian Boult,1937
Royal Liverpool Philharmonic Orchestra, Sir Charles Groves, 1969
Hallé Orchestra, and Band of the Royal Military School of Music, Kneller Hall, Sir John Barbirolli, 1969
City of Birmingham Symphony Orchestra, Louis Frémaux, 1976
Cambridge Cooperative Band, Arthur Wills organ [arr.  Wills], David Read, 1982
Philharmonia Orchestra, Sir David Willcocks, 1991
Bournemouth Symphony Orchestra, Andrew Litton, 1995
Black Dyke Mills Band  [arr. Wright], James Watson, 1995
Robert Gower (organ) [arr. Murrill], 1996
London Philharmonic Orchestra, Sir Roger Norrington, 2000
English Northern Philharmonia, Paul Daniel, 2001
Band of the Scots Guards  [arr. Duthoit], Major R. J. Owen, 2002

Source: Walton Trust.

Notes, references and sources

Notes

References

Sources
  
 
 
 

Compositions by William Walton
March music
1937 compositions
Music for orchestra and organ
Compositions in C major
Coronation of George VI and Elizabeth